Merocrates is a monotypic moth genus in the family Lecithoceridae. Its single species, Merocrates themelias, is found on New Guinea. Both the genus and species were first described by Edward Meyrick in 1931.

References

Lecithoceridae
Monotypic moth genera